Jack Steele is an Australian rules footballer.

Jack Steele may also refer to:

 Jack E. Steele (1924 – 2009), American medical doctor and army officer who coined the term bionics
 Jack Steele (rugby union) (born 1992), Scottish rugby union player
 Jack Steele (soccer) (born 1932), Canadian soccer player

See also
Jack Steel, New Zealand rugby player
John Steele (disambiguation)